This article lists the presidents of Rwanda since the creation of the office in 1961 (during the Rwandan Revolution), to the present day.

The president of Rwanda is the head of state and head of executive of the Republic of Rwanda. The president is elected every seven years by popular vote, and appoints the prime minister and all other members of Cabinet.

A total of 4 people have served in the office. The incumbent president is Paul Kagame, who took office on 22 April 2000, after being acting president for nearly a month.

Key
Political parties

Other factions

Status

List of officeholders

Timeline

Latest election

See also

 Politics of Rwanda
 List of kings of Rwanda
 Vice President of Rwanda
 Prime Minister of Rwanda
 List of colonial governors of Ruanda-Urundi
 List of colonial residents of Rwanda

Notes

References

External links
World Statesmen – Rwanda

Rwanda
 
1961 establishments in Rwanda
Presidents
Presidents